Cottonwoodhill is the debut album by Brainticket.

The LP's original inner sleeve warns: "After Listening to this Record, your friends may not know you anymore" and "Only listen to this once a day. Your brain might be destroyed!"

Track listing
 "Black Sand" (Ron Bryer, Joel Vandroogenbroeck) – 4:05 
 "Places of Light" (Bryer, Dawn Muir, Vandroogenroeck) – 4:05 
 "Brainticket, Pt. 1" (Bryer, Kolbe, Muir, Vandroogenbroeck) – 8:21 
 "Brainticket, Pt. 1: Conclusion" (Bryer, Kolbe, Muir, Vandroogenbroeck) – 4:36 
 "Brainticket, Pt. 2" (Bryer, Kolbe, Muir, Vandroogenbroeck) – 13:13

Personnel

Brainticket
 Ron Bryer – guitar
 Werner Frohlich – bass, bass guitar
 Hellmuth Kolbe – keyboards, sound effects
 Cosimo Lampis – drums
 Dawn Muir – vocals
 Wolfgang Paap – percussion, tabla
 Joel Vandroogenbroeck – organ, flute, keyboards, vocals

Technical
 Hellmuth Kolbe – producer, engineer, electronics, supervisor, generator

References

External links
[ Cottonwoodhill] at Allmusic

Brainticket albums
1971 debut albums
Bellaphon Records albums